Naomi Haile Girma (born June 14, 2000) is an American professional soccer player who plays as a defender for San Diego Wave FC in the National Women's Soccer League (NWSL) and the United States national team. She was the #1 pick of the 2022 NWSL Draft. 

Girma has represented the United States on the  under-17, under-19 and under-20 national teams, and was named U.S. Soccer Young Female Player of the Year in 2020. In 2019, she captained the Stanford Cardinal to win the Women's College Cup.

Early life and education
Girma was born in San Jose, California, to parents Girma Aweke and Seble Demissie, both Ethiopian immigrants who met in the Bay Area. She has one brother, Nathaniel, who is three years older. Her family spoke both Amharic and English.

As a youth, Girma played for a local club her father formed for the Bay Area Ethiopian community in 2005 dubbed the Maleda Soccer Club, and attended Hacienda Elementary School and YMCA after-school basketball matches, following her brother's lead in sports. She also practiced gymnastics for five years before settling on soccer in middle school. After impressing coaches in 2009 during a practice to which she was invited by a friend, Girma joined local youth club Central Valley Crossfire from 2010 to its dissolution in 2017. At Crossfire, Girma played under coach Bob Joyce, during which she was encouraged to participate in Olympic Development Program events and was called into the United States U-14 national team camp. She subsequently became a guest player for De Anza Force, and also played for the California Thorns Academy and Pioneer High School.

Collegiate career 
Girma played college soccer for the Stanford Cardinal, for whom she served as team captain and won the 2019 Women's College Cup. She missed the early part of the 2021 season after tearing her ACL. During her recovery, she applied to and was accepted into the Mayfield Fellows Program for entrepreneurship at Stanford. In December 2021, Girma decided to forego her remaining collegiate eligibility and declared for the 2022 NWSL Draft. She graduated from Stanford in 2022 with a Bachelor of Arts degree in symbolic systems and continued pursuing a master's degree in management science and engineering at Stanford after becoming a professional soccer player.

Club career
San Diego Wave FC selected Girma as the first pick of the 2022 NWSL Draft. She was named to the NWSL Best XI of the Month in May and June of 2022, and also NWSL Rookie of the Month in June.

International career
Girma played for the United States under-17, United States under-19 and United States under-20 teams. She captained the under-20 team. In December 2020, Girma was voted the 2020 U.S. Soccer Young Female Player of the Year.

Girma received her first call-up to the United States senior team in December 2019 but had to withdraw due to injury. She was called up again in October 2020. She debuted for the senior national team on April 12, 2022, in an international friendly against Uzbekistan. She also appeared in the 2022 CONCACAF W Championship, and registered an assist on a goal by Sophia Smith against Jamaica during the tournament.

Career statistics

International

Honors
Stanford Cardinal
 Women's College Cup: 2019

United States
 CONCACAF Women's Championship: 2022
 CONCACAF Women's U-20 Championship: 2020
 CONCACAF Women's U-17 Championship: 2016
 SheBelieves Cup: 2023

Individual

 CONCACAF W Championship Best XI: 2022
 U.S. Soccer Young Female Player of the Year: 2020

NWSL Defender of the Year: 2022
NWSL Rookie of the Year: 2022
NWSL Best XI: 2022
NWSL Team of the Month: May 2022, June 2022
NWSL Rookie of the Month: June 2022
Women's College Cup Defensive MVP: 2019
 Pac-12 Defender of the Year: 2019, 2021

References

External links
 
 
 
 Naomi Girma profile for San Diego Wave FC
 Naomi Girma profile for Stanford Cardinal women's soccer
 

2000 births
Living people
American women's soccer players
United States women's under-20 international soccer players
United States women's international soccer players
Stanford Cardinal women's soccer players
San Diego Wave FC players
Women's association football midfielders
Women's association football defenders
American people of Ethiopian descent
American sportspeople of African descent
Sportspeople of Ethiopian descent
African-American women's soccer players
National Women's Soccer League players
San Diego Wave FC draft picks
De Anza Force women's players